Hesperanoplium is a genus of beetles in the family Cerambycidae, containing the following species:

 Hesperanoplium antennatum (Linsley, 1932)
 Hesperanoplium notabile (Knull, 1947)

References

Hesperophanini